Santa Fe Pete is a 1925 American silent Western film starring Pete Morrison. The film is a low-budget independent western made in the East.

This is a surviving film preserved at the Library of Congress.

Plot summary 
Warren Randolph (Pete Morrison) is a rancher from New Mexico who travels to Virginia to help a family friend, Colonel Henry Morgan (Louis Fitzroy).  Morgan has lost everything, and his property is being sold at auction.  Unbeknownst to Morgan, Morrison purchase the property.  Morgan's prize horse is stolen, and Morrison captures the thief and recovers the horse.

Cast
 Pete Morrison - Warren Randolph, aka Santa Fe Pete
 Louis Fitzroy - Colonel Henry Morgan
 Beth Darlington - Lucy
 Lew Meehan - Dan Murray
 Lightning - Horse

References

External links
  Santa Fe Pete at IMDb.com
 

1925 films
Films directed by Harry S. Webb
1925 Western (genre) films
American black-and-white films
Silent American Western (genre) films
1920s American films